The 3 Worlds of Gulliver is a 1960 Eastmancolor Columbia Pictures fantasy film loosely based upon the 1726 novel Gulliver's Travels by Jonathan Swift. The film stars Kerwin Mathews as the title character, June Thorburn as his fiancée Elizabeth, and child actress Sherry Alberoni as Glumdalclitch.

Filmed in England and Spain, The 3 Worlds of Gulliver was directed by Jack Sher and featured stop-motion animation and special visual effects by Ray Harryhausen. The cast includes Martin Benson as Flimnap, Lee Patterson as Reldresal, Jo Morrow as Gwendolyn, Mary Ellis as the Queen of Brobdingnag, Marian Spencer as the Empress of Lilliput, Peter Bull as Lord Bermogg and Alec Mango as the Minister of Lilliput.

Plot
In 1699, Dr Lemuel Gulliver is an impoverished surgeon who seeks riches and adventure as a ship's doctor on a voyage around the world. His fiancée Elizabeth strongly wishes for him to settle down, and the two quarrel.

Gulliver embarks on the voyage and soon discovers that Elizabeth has stowed away aboard his ship to be near him. A storm develops and sweeps him overboard. Gulliver is washed ashore on Lilliput, a land of tiny humans who see him as a threatening giant. The Lilliputians are afraid of Gulliver and tie him down with stakes to the beach, but he eases their fears by performing several acts of kindness. An old quarrel between Lilliput and neighboring Blefuscu is revived, and Gulliver lends a hand by towing Blefuscu's warships far out to sea. Lilliput's emperor then views the giant as a threat to his throne after Gulliver is critical of the reasons for the war (a debate about which end of an egg to cut). Gulliver escapes in a boat that he had previously built when the emperor orders his execution.

He makes his way to a large isle called Brobdingnag, unaware that it is inhabited by Brobdingnagians, a race of 60-foot giants. After making shore, he encounters a very kind 40-foot peasant girl named Glumdalclitch, who finds him on the shore and carries him to the castle of King Brob. Their law requires that all tiny people be brought to the king, who has a collection of "tiny animals." Gulliver is delighted to find Elizabeth, who was washed ashore following a shipwreck. The king installs the two in a dollhouse and lets Glumdalclitch look after them.

The king marries Gulliver and Elizabeth. After the wedding, Gulliver and Elizabeth go outside to celebrate but are attacked by a giant squirrel, which drags Gulliver into its burrow. However, Glumdalclitch is alerted and saves Gulliver by pulling him out of the burrow using her hair. When Gulliver later defeats the king at chess and cures the queen of a simple stomachache, Prime Minister Makovan accuses Gulliver of witchcraft. Gulliver attempts to explain science to them, but this is taken as further proof of sorcery. After Gulliver is forced to say what the king wanted to hear from him, the king orders Gulliver's execution and unleashes his pet crocodile against Gulliver, but Gulliver is able to slay the creature. The king orders him burned, but Glumdalclitch saves Gulliver and Elizabeth from the pursuing Brobdingnagians by placing them in her sewing basket and tossing it into a brook that flows out to the sea.

Gulliver and Elizabeth wake on a beach with Glumdalclitch's small basket behind them. A passerby of their own size indicates that they are only a short distance from their home in England. Elizabeth asks if it had all been a dream. Gulliver, now happy to settle down with Elizabeth, replies that the bad qualities of Lilliput's pettiness and Brobdingnag's ignorance are inside everyone. When Elizabeth asks about Glumdalclitch, Gulliver gives her a knowing look and says that she has yet to be born.

Cast

 Kerwin Mathews as Dr. Lemuel Gulliver
 Jo Morrow as Gwendolyn
 June Thorburn as Elizabeth
 Lee Patterson as Reldresal
 Grégoire Aslan as King Brob
 Basil Sydney as Emperor of Lilliput
 Charles Lloyd-Pack as Makovan
 Martin Benson as Flimnap
 Mary Ellis as Queen of Brobdingnag
 Marian Spencer as Empress of Lilliput
 Peter Bull as Lord Bermogg
 Alec Mango as Minister of Lilliput
 Sherri Alberoni as Glumdalclitch
 Oliver Johnston as Mr. Grinch
 Waveney Lee as Shrike - Makovan's daughter

Production
The project began as a script by Arthur Ross. He and producer Elliot Lewis pitched a fantasy film to NBC that would combine two Gulliver's Travels stories, "Lilliput" and "Brobdingdang." NBC approved the script but Ross says that the project died because of a strike by the Writers Guild. Jack Sher then became attached as producer and the project was planned at Universal as a feature.

Charles Schneer said that Bryan Foy developed the property at Columbia. When Foy moved to Warner Bros., chief executive Ben Kahane gave the project to Schneer. According to Schneer, Ross and Sher rewrote the script.

In October 1958, it was announced that Schneer, who called the project "the most complicated picture ever attempted," would produce Gulliver's Travels, to be directed by Jack Sher. Columbia was announced as the film's distributor. According to Sher, the film was allocated an insufficient budget.

The film, which was shot in Spain, featured 150 trick sequences. It would be the second film featuring Ray Harryhausen's "Dynamation" process; The 7th Voyage of Sinbad was the first. The oldest Harryhausen model still existing that was made for the film is that of the squirrel, obtained from a taxidermist by Harryhausen. The original armatured model of the crocodile used in the film was mysteriously lost.

According to Kerwin Matthews, Columbia wanted Jack Lemmon to play the lead, but Lemmon turned it down. Schneer says that Sher wanted Lemmon but Columbia did not: "He was considered a comedy actor, and wasn't taken seriously as a dramatic actor. Also, I don't think Harry Cohn wanted Lemmon to do the picture. So, Kerwin was really our only other choice. He was one of the few American actors who could play a classical role, and would look right in a period costume."

Jo Morrow starred in the film at the same time during which she was appearing in Our Man in Havana. She had an affair with Sher during filmmaking, and she says that it affected her performance.

Schenner later said:
Sher wanted to make a name for himself as a director but he didn't have sufficient experience to direct the picture. It was the first time we had that problem with a director. Fortunately, we had a wonderful cameraman named Wilkie Cooper. Ray, Wilkie and I directed the camera, and we let Sher talk the actors through their lines. We didn't want to undermine him with the actors, so we would tell him, 'This is what we want. Please do it'— and he would. Sher got the screen credit, but he was out of his depth, and he knew it.
The film's premiere, attended by Princess Margaret, was a benefit for charity.

Reception
In The New York Times of December 17, 1960, Eugene Archer praised the film's technical achievement in stop-motion animation and enthusiastically recommended it for children but noted: "While the adults will find it all too mechanical to really capture the imagination, and may resent the unclear ending that seems certain to provoke some youthful queries, they should be grateful for a children's film that treats a classic without condescension or burlesque."

Comic book adaption
 Dell Four Color #1158 (January 1961)

See also
 List of stop-motion films
 List of films featuring miniature people

References

External links
 
 
 
 
 

1960 films
1960s fantasy adventure films
1960s science fiction films
American children's adventure films
American children's fantasy films
American fantasy adventure films
Columbia Pictures films
1960s English-language films
Films adapted into comics
Films based on Gulliver's Travels
Films directed by Jack Sher
Films scored by Bernard Herrmann
Fiction set in 1699
Films set in the 1690s
Films shot in England
Films shot in the province of Ávila
Films using stop-motion animation
Films with screenplays by Jack Sher
Films produced by Charles H. Schneer
1960s American films